The Women's County Championship, known since 2014 as the Royal London Women’s One-Day Cup, was a women's cricket competition organised by the England and Wales Cricket Board. It was the women's equivalent of the County Championship, although it operated as a 50-over limited overs cricket competition with teams organised into a number of divisions. It was introduced in 1997 to replace the Women's Area Championship.

The teams competing in the Championship were drawn mostly from the historic counties of England, with 32 teams representing these. The Scottish national side competed in the competition since 2007, the Wales women's national cricket team since 2008 and the Netherlands joined in 2009. The Ireland national team played in the competition between 2009 and 2015 before withdrawing in early 2016.

The competition was the longest established women's cricket competition in England and Wales. It operated alongside the Women's Twenty20 Cup, established in 2009, and the Women's Cricket Super League between 2016 and 2019, a franchise league with six teams playing Twenty20 cricket.

2019, won by Kent, was the final season of the Championship due to a restructuring of women's cricket in England. From 2020, the only 50-over tournament was competed by regional teams, initially in the Rachael Heyhoe Flint Trophy. Kent were the most successful county in the history of the Championship with eight titles, whilst Sussex and Yorkshire both won six titles.

History
The inaugural Women's County Championship took place in 1997, with 16 teams competing in three divisions. This first tournament was organised and run by the Women's Cricket Association, which voted to merge with the England and Wales Cricket Board (ECB) on 29 March 1998. As such, the ECB has administered the competition since 1998.

Yorkshire were the winners of five of the first six Championships, with East Midlands breaking their run in 1999. After this began a period that was dominated by Sussex and Kent. Sussex won six titles between 2003 and 2013, including three in a row between 2003 and 2005, whilst Kent won eight titles between 2006 and 2019. Yorkshire managed one more title, in 2015, whilst Lancashire and Hampshire have won one title apiece, in 2017 and 2018, respectively. Hampshire's title came after a remarkable rise through the divisions, winning Division 3 in 2015 and Division 2 in 2017 before being crowned County Champions one year later.

2019 marked the final year of the County Championship as women's cricket in England was restructured by the ECB, paving the way for a regionalised 50-over tournament, as well as the Women's Hundred.

Structure
The Championship operated on a league structure, with varying amounts of divisions and teams over its history. The first Championship involved 16 teams split across three divisions. Gradually more teams were added over the years (and county sides replaced the regional and Second XI sides that initially competed), and in 2004, which had 24 participants, a second tier was added, the County Challenge Cup. In 2008 (which had 33 teams participating) the Challenge Cup was ended and teams were placed in Divisions 1 to 5. This became four divisions in 2012 and finally three divisions in 2017, a structure that continued until the Championship ended in 2019.

Varying amounts of teams have participated in the Championship over the years, reaching a peak of 38 teams in 2015. 35 teams competed in the final season of the Championship in 2019. The teams that have participated in the tournament are:

Roll of honour

See also 
 Women's Area Championship
 Super Fours
 Women's Twenty20 Cup
 Women's Cricket Super League
 Rachael Heyhoe Flint Trophy

References

 
English domestic cricket competitions
Women's cricket competitions in England
Recurring sporting events established in 1997
1997 establishments in England